Dealing with Destiny is a 2011 Australian comedy film starring Luke Arnold and is directed by Colm O'Murchu. Dealing with Destiny centers around two friends, Blake and Lloyd, who are brilliant physics students competing for the University Medal on their final day of study. As they and their friends get caught up in a series of last day pranks which backfire, misunderstandings arise amongst them and conflict ensues.

Cast
 Luke Arnold as Blake
 Clayton Moss as Lloyd
 Roger Sciberras as Vinnie
 Steve Maresca as Ricardo
 Catherine Farrah as Zara
 Emma Leonard as Destiny
 Barry Quin as Professor Sorvad
 Gillian Cooper as Angelica

Reception

Catherine Brown of Filmink gave it a mixed review saying "the film's biggest flaw is that it plays out more like the pilot of a sitcom, lacking the substance required to make its relatively short eighty-minute running time seem justified." But in its defense she noted the strength of the movie came from the performances of its leads: "Luke Arnold in a likeable performance" and "The film is also worth a look to scope out Australia's emerging acting talent including Clayton Moss, Steve Maresca and Catherine Jermanus." Louise Keller of Urban Cinefile noted in her review "The characters are likable enough and the Sydney settings are appealing although the film lacks a proper storyline which means it plays on a superficial level. University pranks and attractive girls per se do not necessarily make for a complete and satisfying film."

Simon Foster of SBS Movies gave a negative review, saying it was "a college-campus caper that, given its twee bawdiness and stereotypical characterisations, would’ve been right at home on a video store shelf in the early '80s.." September 1, 2011

References

External links
 
 Dealing with Destiny Official Website

2011 films
2011 comedy films
2010s English-language films
Australian comedy films